| alter_ego = Ororo Munroe
| species = Human mutant 
| alliances = X-MenAvengersFantastic Four
| aliases = Weather WitchWhite KingWindrider
| powers = *Atmokinesis
Flight
Ecological empathy
Temperature and pressure resistance
| cat = super
| subcat = Marvel Comics
| hero = y
| villain =
| sortkey = Storm (Marvel Comics)
|homeworld=New York City}}

Storm is a superhero appearing in American comic books published by Marvel Comics. Created by writer Len Wein and artist Dave Cockrum, the character first appeared in Giant-Size X-Men #1 (May 1975). Descended from a long line of African witch-priestesses, Storm is a member of a fictional subspecies of humans born with superhuman abilities known as mutants. She is able to control the weather and atmosphere and is considered to be one of the most powerful mutants on the planet, and one of the most powerful beings in the Marvel Universe.

Born Ororo Munroe to a tribal princess of Kenya and an African-American photojournalist father, Storm is raised in Harlem, New York City, United States and Cairo, Egypt. She was made an orphan after her parents were killed in the midst of an Arab–Israeli conflict. An incident at this time also traumatized Munroe, leaving her with claustrophobia that she would struggle with for life. Storm is a member of the X-Men, a group of mutant heroes fighting for peace and equal rights between mutants and humans. Under the tutelage of a master thief an adolescent Munroe became a skilled pickpocket, the means of which she meets through coincidence the powerful mutant Professor X. Professor X later convinces Munroe to join the X-Men and use her abilities for a greater cause and purpose. Possessing natural leadership skills and formidable powers of her own, Storm has led the X-Men at times and has been a member of teams such as the Avengers and the Fantastic Four as well. Storm is also part of one of the higher-profile romantic relationships in all of comics. Having married childhood sweetheart and fellow superhero Black Panther, the ruler of the fictional African nation of Wakanda, Munroe was made queen consort through marriage. The title was lost however when the two later divorced.

Created during the Bronze Age of Comic Books, Storm is the first major female character of African descent in comics. She is regarded by some as being Marvel Comics' most important female superhero, having drawn favorable comparison to DC Comics' most famous female lead Wonder Woman. When Marvel and DC Comics published a DC vs. Marvel miniseries in 1996, Storm was pitted against Wonder Woman in a one-on-one battle and emerged victorious due to winning a popular vote amongst readers. 

Storm has been described as one of Marvel's most notable and powerful female heroes.

One of the most prominent characters in the X-Men series, Storm has appeared in various forms of media relating to the franchise, including animation, television, video games, and a series of films. The character was first portrayed in live-action by Halle Berry in 2000 film X-Men. Berry returned to portray the role in the films X2, X-Men: The Last Stand, and X-Men: Days of Future Past. The younger version of Storm was portrayed by Alexandra Shipp in the 2016 film X-Men: Apocalypse. Shipp had a cameo in Deadpool 2 and reprised her role in the 2019 film X-Men: Dark Phoenix.

Publication history

1975–1979: Origin and early stories

Storm first appeared in 1975 in the comic book Giant-Size X-Men #1, written by Len Wein and pencilled by Dave Cockrum.  In this comic, Wein uses a battle against the living island Krakoa to replace the first-generation X-Men of the 1960s with new X-Men. Storm was an amalgam of two characters Cockrum created: The Black Cat and Typhoon. The Black Cat had Storm's costume, minus the cape, and was submitted for the new X-Men's original lineup. However, during a hiatus in the new X-Men project, other female cat characters like Tigra were introduced, making the Black Cat redundant.

Since the creative team did not want the X-Men to have an all-male lineup, editor Roy Thomas suggested that Cockrum make his character Typhoon, originally designed as a male, into the woman of the group. Cockrum liked the idea and outfitted Typhoon with The Black Cat's costume, a cape, and a new haircut with white hair. His collaborators feared that Storm's white hair would make her look like a grandmother, but Cockrum, confident that he could consistently draw the character so that she would appear young, insisted on this aspect of her appearance.

Chris Claremont followed up Wein as the writer of the flagship title The Uncanny X-Men in 1975, writing many notable X-Men stories, among them God Loves, Man Kills and "Dark Phoenix Saga", which served as the basis for the films X2: X-Men United and X-Men: The Last Stand, respectively. In both arcs, Storm is written as a major supporting character. Claremont stayed the main writer of X-Men for the next 16 years and consequently wrote most of the publications containing Storm.

Backstory
In The Uncanny X-Men #102 (December 1976), Claremont established Storm's backstory. Storm's mother, N'Dare, was the princess of a tribe in Kenya and descended from a long line of African witch-priestesses with white hair, blue eyes, and a natural gift for sorcery.  N'Dare falls in love with and marries American photojournalist, David Munroe. They move to Harlem in uptown New York City, where Ororo is born. They later moved to Egypt and lived there until they die during the Suez Crisis in a botched aircraft attack, leaving six-year-old Ororo as an orphan.  Her violent claustrophobia is established as a result of being buried under tons of rubble after that attack. She becomes a skilled thief in Cairo under the benign Achmed el-Gibar and wanders into the Serengeti as a young woman. She is worshipped as a goddess when her powers appear before being recruited by Professor X for the X-Men.

Claremont further fleshed out Storm's backstory in The Uncanny X-Men #117 (January 1979). He retroactively added that Professor X, who recruits her in Giant Size X-Men #1 of 1975, had already met her as a child in Cairo. As Ororo grows up on the streets and becomes a proficient thief under the tutelage of master thief Achmed el-Gibar, one of her most notable victims was Charles Francis Xavier, later Professor X. He is able to use his mental powers to temporarily prevent her escape and recognizes the potential in her. However, when Xavier is attacked mentally by Amahl Farouk, the Shadow King, the two men are preoccupied enough with their battle to allow the girl to escape. Both Xavier and the Shadow King recognize Storm as the young girl later.

1980s: Punk look and loss of powers
In the following issues, Claremont portrayed Storm as a serene, independent character. Although Storm was initially written having trouble adjusting to Western culture, e.g. calling the obligation to wear clothing in public "absurd", in The Uncanny X-Men #139 (November 1980), Claremont established her as the leader of the X-Men after Cyclops takes a leave of absence, a position she holds in various incarnations. Claremont also established a maternal relationship between Storm and the 13-year-old X-Man Kitty Pryde. A short story by Claremont set during Storm's childhood in Kenya that ran in Marvel Team-Up #100 (December 1980), establishes that when she was 12 years old, Storm saved a young Black Panther from racist thugs. This story would later become the basis for later writers to establish a deeper relationship between both characters.

In the early 1980s, adventures of Storm written by Claremont included a space opera arc, in which the X-Men fight parasitic beings called the Brood. Storm is infected with a Brood egg and contemplates suicide, but then experiences a last-minute save by the benign whale-like Acanti aliens. Storm's fellow X-Man Angel is abducted by a rogue mutant group called the Morlocks. The X-Men are outnumbered, and Storm is rendered sick by the Morlock called Plague. To save Kitty's life, Storm challenges the Morlocks' leader Callisto, in a duel to the death for the leadership of the Morlocks. Despite being violently sick, she defeats Callisto by stabbing her with a knife. Callisto is saved through the efforts of a Morlock healer, and Storm offers the Morlocks refuge at the Xavier Mansion, though they decline.

In The Uncanny X-Men #173 (October 1983), Claremont and artist Paul Smith created a new look for Storm, abandoning her old costume for black leather top and pants, and changing her former veil of white hair into a punk mohawk. The change in appearance was inspired by the decision of colleague Walt Simonson to shave off his beard and mustache while on vacation with his wife, X-Men editor Louise Simonson. Upon their return, Simonson's daughter, Julie, upset at her father's new appearance, ran from the room. When the editors decided to change Storm's appearance, Smith submitted a number of designs to them, explaining in a 2008 interview:

I did a number of portraits, all quite lovely and feminine. As a joke, I included a shot of her as Mr. T. You know, the kind of shot where they HAVE to go the other way. Weezie [X-Men editor Louise Simonson]'s response? 'They're going to hang us whichever way we go. Let's commit the murder.' I argued it was a joke and a monstrously bad idea but, given my departure following 175 was set prior to beginning my run, my vote didn't count. So I did what I could with what I had left... So we went with the Mohawk ...But once you get into the whole leather and stud thing it was a bad joke that got way out of hand.

Julie Simonson's reaction to her father's new appearance would be mirrored in X-Man Kitty Pryde's heartbroken rejection of Storm's new look. In the story, Storm's outlook on life darkens after her struggles with the Brood. These changes alienate her from Kitty for a time. Storm is influenced in this by Yukio, a friend of Wolverine, and the two become fast friends; while the characters' relationship was originally conceived of as romantic, it was relegated to subtext after Marvel Comics' editor-in-chief Jim Shooter mandated that no same-gender couples could be depicted in comic books during his tenure at the company due to controversy in response to "A Very Personal Hell", a story Shooter had previously written in an issue of The Rampaging Hulk. Claremont wrote an arc in which fellow mutant Forge develops a mutant power neutralizing gun. The intended target is another X-Man, Rogue, but Storm is hit instead, taking away her powers. Forge takes her back to his home in Dallas, Texas to recover. They fall in love, but when she learns that Forge built the weapon that took her powers, she is heartbroken and leaves him.

By 1986, the question arose of whether the X-Men would be led by Storm or by Cyclops, who was now married to Madelyne Pryor and an expectant husband. The two settled the matter in a duel in the Danger Room that saw Storm victorious. It was later revealed during the "Inferno" storyline that Madelyne's nascent psychic abilities had emerged during that duel, unbeknownst to her or anyone, and that she had subconsciously used those abilities to influence the duel.

During the 1988 "Fall of the Mutants" storyline, Storm is trapped in another dimension with Forge, who restores her elemental powers. Following her rejoining the X-Men, they defeat a demonic enemy called the Adversary, in a battle in which the public believes the X-Men have died. They survive, with the help of the celestial being known as Roma. Using a spell Roma has cast upon them to be invisible to electronic equipment, the X-Men set up new headquarters in a small frontier village in the Australian Outback, after expelling a group of mutant-hunting cyborgs called Reavers who had been living there. Storm is captured by the cyborg Nanny. Although believed slain in that encounter, she resurfaced, having become amnesiac as a result of being physically regressed to childhood by Nanny. She is hunted by the evil telepath Shadow King and framed for murder, and finally returns to thieving. While she slowly starts to regain her memories, she meets with Gambit and they return to the X-Men together.

In the following arc, "The X-Tinction Agenda", she is kidnapped by the mutant-exploiting nation of Genosha and is temporarily transformed into a brainwashed slave, but in the end, is restored physically and mentally to her adult prime.

1990s

In October 1991, the X-Men franchise was re-launched, centering on the new eponymous X-Men comic. Claremont wrote Storm as the leader of the X-Men's Gold Team. The other team, Blue, was led by her colleague Cyclops, the X-Man she once succeeded as the leader. In the sister title Uncanny X-Men, now under Scott Lobdell, Lobdell continued on the romance between Storm and Forge, which culminated in Forge's proposal to wed in 1992. Storm's slight hesitation, however, is misinterpreted by Forge, who then rescinds his offer before it can be accepted. Lobdell waited until November 1993 before he wrote a reconciliation between the deeply pained Storm and Forge. In 1995, Lobdell continued an arc again pitting the X-Men against the Morlocks. As Claremont did with Callisto in 1983, Lobdell has Storm ending the battle by wounding her opponent in the heart. Here, Storm rips out one heart of the two-hearted Morlock girl Marrow, which has a bomb affixed to it. In February 1996, Storm got her first miniseries, the eponymous Storm. In the first arc of the series, Warren Ellis writes a story in which Storm is sucked into an alternate dimension and pitted against villain Mikhail Rasputin.

2000s
In X-Treme X-Men, conceived by a newly reinstated Chris Claremont in July 2001, Storm was written as the leader of this team, and the central character of the book, until its end in issue #46 (June 2004). During this time, Storm enjoys a brief flirtation with younger fellow X-Man Slipstream and is kidnapped by the intergalactic warlord Khan. In the series, Storm also becomes the leader of the X-Treme Sanctions Executive, a special police task force of mutants policing mutants given worldwide authority.

During the 2005 "Decimation" storyline, in which 90% of the mutants lose their powers, Storm is among the 198 mutants who retain their powers. Also that year, the miniseries Ororo: Before the Storm by writer Mark Sumerak retold her backstory in greater detail, concentrating on her relationship with surrogate father figure Achmed el-Gibar during her childhood.

The following year, Marvel Comics announced that Storm would marry fellow African super hero Black Panther. Collaborating writer Eric Jerome Dickey explained that it was a move to explicitly target the female and African American audience. Storm's history with Black Panther, including the initial meeting of the characters, was retconned by Marvel during the lead up to their marriage. Initially, in Marvel Team-Up #100 (1980), Storm is seen at age twelve rescuing Black Panther from a white racist called Andreas de Ruyter, but in Dickey's miniseries, T'Challa saves Ororo (who is still twelve) from de Ruyter and his brother. A Black Panther #24 (2006) flashback is ambiguous when it comes to the physical aspect of their first meeting, while the miniseries depicts Ororo giving her virginity to T'Challa a few days after they meet. Collaborating writer Axel Alonso, editor of Black Panther, has stated: "Eric's story, for all intents and purposes (...) is Ororo's origin story."  The relationship led to the marriage of the two most prominent black African Marvel Comics heroes in Black Panther #18 by writer Reginald Hudlin, July 2006, as a tie-in to the "Civil War" storyline. Marvel Comics editor-in-chief Joe Quesada was highly supportive of this marriage, stating it was the Marvel Comics equivalent of the marriage of "Lady Diana and Prince Charles", and he expected both characters to emerge strengthened. Shawn Dudley, the Emmy-Award Winning Costume Designer for TV's Guiding Light designed Storm's wedding dress, which was revealed in the April 17 issue of TV Guide, though the design was greatly altered for the comic event. In 2007, when Mister Fantastic and the Invisible Woman take time off from the Fantastic Four to work on their marriage in the aftermath of the "Civil War" storyline, Storm and Black Panther become temporary members of the Fantastic Four. Storm later returned to the Uncanny X-Men.

Storm joins the reformed Astonishing X-Men #25 because she explains, Wakanda is a supporter of Mutantes Sans Frontieres and she believes she should be on the front line, however, she is also somewhat bored of her life as queen. The reemergence of the Shadow King later forces Storm to choose between her role as queen and her role as an X-Man. Confronting the Panther God Bast, Storm asserts that she is not limited to being one or the other or anything else and that she is unafraid to do whatever is necessary to fulfill those responsibilities. Regaining Bast's favor, the two defeat the Shadow King and Storm decides that she will remain Queen of Wakanda and remain with the X-Men, refusing to choose between them. Seeking to re-learn his limitations, T'Challa later leaves Africa and takes a new role as the guardian of Hell's Kitchen following the events of Shadowland; Though the two remain a couple, Storm sadly but respectfully accepts T'Challa's request for temporary isolation so that he can find himself.

2010s
After the 2011 revamp of the X-Men related comic books Storm appears as the leader of a defensive, reconnaissance-based team of X-Men in the ongoing X-Men title. In November that year, Storm joined the Avengers in The Avengers vol. 4 #19. She leaves the team to fight alongside the X-Men during the "Avengers vs. X-Men" storyline, which has her facing off against T'Challa when he sides with the Avengers. When a Phoenix-empowered Namor destroys Wakanda, Storm realizes the Phoenix Five are out of control and returns to help the Avengers. However, she is stunned when T'Challa tells her he has annulled their marriage.

In April 2013, Marvel debuted a new all-female series simply named X-Men. Written by Brian Wood with art by Olivier Coipel, X-Men features a roster of Storm, Jubilee, Rogue, Kitty Pryde, Rachel Grey and Psylocke.

In late 2013, Marvel debuted Amazing X-Men by writer Jason Aaron, which featured Storm as a member of the team.

July 2014 saw the debut of a Storm solo series written by Greg Pak with art by Victor Inanez.

In the aftermath of "Secret Wars" storyline, Storm became the leader of the Extraordinary X-Men. The aim of the team was to provide a safe haven for mutants following the release of the Terrigen Mist, which is toxic to mutants. To protects the mutants, Storm relocated the team to Limbo. During Civil War II, Storm sided with Captain Marvel and was pitted against Magneto. Despite the tension between mutants and the Inhumans, Storm attempted to build an alliance with Medusa. When Magneto's X-Men attacked New Attilan, Storm's team clashed with the former villain. Storm reluctantly led the X-Men into a war with the Inhumans.

Following the war with the Inhumans, Storm steps down as leader of the X-Men and is replaced by Kitty Pryde. However, she continues to be a team member in X-Men: Gold. Additionally, Storm appears as a cast member of Black Panther and The Crew, before its cancellation. Storm's magical hammer, known as Stormcaster, briefly returned to her. Later, Munroe joins the X-Men: Red roster, led by the newly resurrected Jean Grey. During the Hunt for Wolverine, Storm helps the X-Men search for Logan in Madripoor. The mission results in a confrontation between the X-Men and the Femme Fatales, led by Viper.

Historical significance

Storm was one of the first black comic book characters, and the first black female, except for Misty Knight, who debuted in a comic dated March 1975, to play either a major or supporting role in the big two comic book houses, Marvel Comics and DC Comics. Within these two companies, her 1975 debut was only preceded by a few male black characters and Misty Knight. In Marvel Comics, preceding characters were Gabe Jones (debuted in 1963), Black Panther (1966), Bill Foster (1966), Spider-Man supporting characters Joe Robertson (1967), his son Randy (1968), Hobie Brown (the Prowler) & The Falcon (1969), Luke Cage (1972), Blade (1973), Abe Brown (1974), and Misty Knight (March 1975).  In DC Comics, she was preceded by Teen Titans member Mal Duncan who debuted in 1970, Green Lantern wielder John Stewart (1971), and Mister Miracle protégé Shilo Norman (1973); she preceded DC's other black heroes, Legion of Super-Heroes member Tyroc (who debuted in 1976), Black Lightning (1977), Bumblebee (1977), Cyborg (1980), Vixen (1981) and Amazing-Man (1983). While not the first black character to be introduced, since her creation Storm has remained the most successful and recognizable black superhero.

Gladys L. Knight, author of Female Action Heroes: A Guide to Women in Comics, Video games, Film, and Television (2010) wrote that "two defining aspects of her persona are her racial identity and her social status as a mutant." The X-Men have symbolically represented marginalized minorities and the debut of the X-Men series coincided with the Civil Rights Movement, in which their plight as mutants mirrored that of African Americans. Storm's creation in particular "was during the heyday of blaxploitation films."

Fictional character biography
Ever since her inception in 1975, Storm's biography has largely stayed the same.  The framework was laid first by Chris Claremont, who fleshed out her backstory in The Uncanny X-Men #102 (1976), #113 (1978) and #117 (1979). Some reinterpretations were made in 2005 and 2006, where writers Mark Sumerak and Eric Jerome Dickey, respectively, rewrote part of her early history in the miniseries Ororo: Before the Storm and Storm vol. 2.

According to established Marvel canon, Ororo Munroe is born in New York City as the child of Kenyan tribal princess N'Dare and American photographer David Munroe. When Ororo is six months old, she and her parents move to the Egyptian capital of Cairo. Five years later, during the Suez Crisis, a fighter jet crashes into her parents' house, killing them. Buried under tons of rubble, Ororo survives but is orphaned and left with intense claustrophobia. Her fear was once so intense that she was known to curl into a fetal position and approach a catatonic state. In late 2000s storylines, however, writers like Ed Brubaker and Christopher Yost have indicated that Storm had largely conquered her claustrophobia, and can freely move in tight spaces, even over long periods of time. After the death of her parents, Ororo wanders Cairo's back-alleys for a few weeks, until she is picked up by the benign street lord Achmed el-Gibar and becomes a prolific thief; among her victims is her future mentor Professor X who is there to meet the Shadow King. Following an inner urge, she wanders into the Serengeti as a teenager and meets T'Challa, who would become her future husband. Despite strong mutual feelings, the two part ways.

In the Serengeti, Ororo first displays her mutant ability to control the weather. Sometime after this, she met the witch-priestess, Ainet, who took her in and became her surrogate mother. Once, when their village was going through a terrible drought, Storm commanded rain for days just to help them. By doing this, she threw off the natural order of nature, and droughts were formed over numerous villages, and hundreds of animals were killed. Sensing the damage, she had done, Ainet told Storm of her kind but poorly considered gesture, and of the damage she caused. Ainet took this opportunity to explain to Ororo how her powers worked with nature, and how she could fix the problem by properly distributing rain.

For a time, she is worshiped as a rain goddess to an African tribe, practicing nudism and tribal spirituality, before being recruited by Professor X into the X-Men. Ororo receives the code name "Storm" and is established as a strong, serene character. In her early career with the X-Men, she suffers a major claustrophobic attack, which prompts a revelation of her origin to her teammates. Jean Grey becomes a close friend as Ororo acclimatizes to the team and the United States, the two supporting each other as the only female X-Men. When Magneto captures the team, Storm frees the X-Men from captivity. Storm is later captured by the White Queen, leading up to the X-Men's clash with Dark Phoenix. She becomes deputy leader of the X-Men, and supplants her colleague Cyclops as leader of the X-Men, a role she fills out during most of her time as a superhero.  She briefly became "Rogue Storm", and even switched bodies with the White Queen. She is attacked by Dracula, and defeats Callisto, becoming the new leader of the Morlocks. Following her leadership of the Morlocks through combat with Callisto, Storm begins to develop a darker side. Eventually, the X-Men are invited to Japan for Wolverine's wedding to Mariko Yashida. It is here that she meets Wolverine's old friend Yukio, and the two become fast friends. Storm is inspired by Yukio, who encourages Storm to embrace her emerging darker side. This leads Storm to drastically change her outward appearance to match her inner self and thus don her iconic punk drab.

In a storyline that began in 1984, Storm is deprived of her superhuman powers by an energy weapon fired by Henry Peter Gyrich; unknown to her, this device was designed by the mutant inventor Forge. The depowered Ororo subsequently meets and falls in love with Forge, but leaves him when she discovers that he is the inventor of the weapon behind her power loss. She helps Forge battle Dire Wraiths, before leaving him to rejoin the X-Men. She aids the New Mutants against the Shadow King Amahl Farouk. She next journeys to Asgard with the X-Men, where she is briefly enslaved by Loki. She is nearly killed in a confrontation with Andreas von Strucker. She defeats Cyclops in a competition to become the X-Men's leader. During the "Fall of the Mutants" storyline, she is reunited with Forge, regains her superhuman powers, and dies with the X-Men in giving her life force to defeat the Adversary; she is resurrected by Roma. She is reverted to childhood by the mutant Nanny, meets Gambit, and is finally returned to adulthood – however, she is enslaved by the Genoshans, but regains her free will and escapes captivity. Concerning her personal life, she is for a long time romantically involved with fellow X-Man Forge, and even considers marrying him before their relationship dissolves.

After 90% of the mutants of the world lose their powers, Storm leaves the X-Men to go to Africa. She rekindles her relationship with T'Challa, now a superhero known as Black Panther, marries him, and becomes the queen of the kingdom of Wakanda. She joins the new Fantastic Four alongside her husband when Reed and Sue take a vacation. On a mission in space, the Watcher tells Black Panther and Storm that their children will have a special destiny. Upon Reed's and Sue's return to the Fantastic Four, Storm and the Black Panther leave, with Storm returning to the Uncanny X-Men to help out with events in Messiah Complex. After joining with the X-Men again, Storm is confronted by Cyclops over her position as an X-Man and a Queen. Cyclops reminds her that she made him choose between family and duty before, and she needs to make the same decision. Storm reacts by returning to Wakanda to face a despondent Black Panther, with the two seemingly falling out with each other, although it is later revealed that the Black Panther had been possessed by the Shadow King. After incapacitating the possessed T'Challa, Storm battles Cyclops, who had been mentally enthralled by the Shadow King to kill the other X-Men. After being forced to drive him out by striking Cyclops through the chest with a massive lightning bolt, the Shadow King then takes control of Storm, only to be devoured in vengeance by Bast, the Panther God, who had agreed to hide inside of Storm's mind to take revenge on the Shadow King for possessing T'Challa.

Around the early 2010, Storm assumes a leadership position in a team operating from the island of Utopia, near San Francisco, after the X-Men: Schism. She took Cyclops's side in the Schism and thus becomes member of his new X-Tinction Team. After Avengers vs. X-Men, when T'Challa officially annuls their marriage, Storm returns to Wolverine's side and they both begin a relationship. During Marvel NOW! (early- to mid-2010s), she also goes back to a punk mohawk look with a new costume, and becomes a member of the Uncanny X-Force (with Psylocke, Spiral, Puck and a female Fantomex) and of an all-female incarnation of X-Men (with Jubilee, Rachel Grey, Rogue, Psylocke, Omega Sentinel and Monet/M). She also stars in her own short-lived solo title.

After the Marvel Universe reboot in the Secret Wars crossover (2015), Storm returns to the fold in Extraordinay X-Men, trying to deal with a new plague called M-Pox. The M-Pox is based on the dispersal on the atmosphere of the Terrigen Mists, and this situation rises the tensions between mutants and Inhumans, culminating in the crossover Inhumans vs. X-Men.

ResurrXion
When Kitty Pryde returns from space to lead the X-Men, Storm joins her and a few familiar faces in the new X-Men Gold title. During the same period, she also rekindles her friendship with a resurrected Jean Grey and joins her Red team.

Dawn of X
In the new status quo for mutants post House of X and Powers of X, Professor X and Magneto invite all mutants to live on Krakoa and welcome even former enemies into their fold. Storm takes part in a quasi-religious ceremony to welcome their newly resurrected comrades, after an attack on an Orchis/Master Mold base in space.

Storm is seen attacking the last compound of Orchis on Earth with Magneto, Polaris and Cyclops. She also is part of the Marauders crew with White Queen, Captain Kitty Pryde, Iceman, Pyro and Bishop.

Another parallel storyline involves her attempts to find a cure for a technorganic infection. Later, after the Hellfire Gala and the terraforming of planet Mars, Storm leaves the Marauders and becomes the regent of Arakko and Voice of the Sol System.

Powers and abilities

Weather control

Storm is one of the most powerful mutants on Earth and has demonstrated a plethora of abilities, most of which are facets of her power to manipulate the weather. Storm possesses the psionic ability to control all forms of weather over vast areas. She has been able to control both Earthly and extraterrestrial ecosystems. She can modify the temperature of the environment, control all forms of precipitation, humidity, and moisture (at a molecular level), generate lightning and other electromagnetic atmospheric phenomena, and has demonstrated excellent control over atmospheric pressure. She can incite all forms of meteorological tempests, such as tornadoes, thunderstorms, blizzards, and hurricanes, as well as mist. She can dissipate such weather to form clear skies as well.

Her precise control over the atmosphere allows her to create special weather effects. She can create precipitation at higher or lower altitudes than normal, make whirlwinds travel pointing lengthwise in any direction, channel ambient electromagnetism through her body to generate electric blasts, flash freeze objects and people, coalesce atmospheric pollutants into acid rain or toxic fog, and, along with her natural ability of flight, summon wind currents strong enough to support her weight to elevate herself (or others) to fly at high altitudes and speeds. Her control is so great that she can even manipulate the air in a person's lungs. She can also control the pressure inside the human inner ear, an ability she uses to cause intense pain. She can also bend light using moisture in the air and her manipulation of mist and fog to appear partially transparent, and in later comics, nearly invisible.

Storm has also demonstrated the ability to control natural forces that include cosmic storms, solar wind, ocean currents, and the electromagnetic field. She has demonstrated the ability to separate water molecules into oxygen and hydrogen via electrolysis, allowing her to breathe underwater. While in outer space, she is able to affect and manipulate the interstellar and intergalactic media. Storm can alter her visual perceptions so as to see the universe in terms of energy patterns, detecting the flow of kinetic, thermal and electromagnetic energy behind weather phenomena and can bend this energy to her will.

Storm has been shown to be sensitive to the dynamics of the natural world, and her psionic powers over the weather are affected by her emotions. One consequence of this connection to nature is that she often suppresses extreme feelings to prevent her emotional state from resulting in violent weather. She has once sensed a diseased and dying tree on the X-Mansion grounds, detected objects within various atmospheric mediums—including water, and sensed the incorrect motion of a hurricane in the Northern Hemisphere and the gravitational stress on the tides by the Moon and Sun as well as the distortion of a planet's magnetosphere. Storm can view the Earth as weather patterns, and is able to precisely recognize her geographic position through interpretations of these patterns. Storm's mutant abilities are limited by her willpower and the strength of her body. Sentinels have considered Storm an Omega-level mutant on one occasion.

Magical potential
Storm's ancestry supports the use of magic and witchcraft. Many of her ancestors were sorceresses and priestesses.  Storm's matrilineal powers have even been linked to the real-world Rain Queens of Balobedu, the region from which her Sorceress Supreme ancestor from the Hyborian Age, Ayesha, hails. The Mystic Arcana series deals with Storm's ancestor Ashake, who worships the Egyptian goddess Ma'at, also known as Oshtur – the mother of Agamotto. Oshtur appears to have strong favor for the bloodline of Ororo. For some unknown reason, since the dawn of Atlantis, this line of African women has been given distinguishing features of white hair, blue eyes, and powerful magic potential. Although Storm has not developed her magical potential, it has been hinted at. The Mystic Arcana series lists the characters with magic potential according to the Marvel Tarot deck.  The Tarot asserts Storm as being "High Priestess", the First Tarot's choice one-third of the time. The other draws were the Scarlet Witch and Agatha Harkness.  These three characters split the High Priestess card equally. A timeline-divergent Storm became the sorceress who taught sorcery to Magik and some of Storm's alternate universe selves possess considerable magical talent. On a separate note, it has been stated that Storm's spirit is so strong that she was able to host the consciousness of an avatar (or "manifestation body") of Eternity; in a gathering consisting of herself, Doctor Strange, Black Panther, Silver Surfer and the Fantastic Four, she and Doctor Strange were the only viable candidates. In Wakanda, Storm is called Hadari-Yao ("Walker of Clouds" in ancient Alkamite), a goddess who preserves the balance of natural things.

Combat and thievery
Storm's willpower is strong enough to defy Dracula's commands after he bites her. She is an expert thief, and a skilled, cunning and gifted hand-to-hand fighter, trained by Achmed el-Gibar, Professor X, Wolverine and T'Challa, the Black Panther. By using superior strategy, Storm has overcome physically stronger foes like Callisto and the Crimson Commando in hand-to-hand combat. Storm is an excellent marksman with handguns, and is proficient in the use of knives. Storm is also fluent in Russian, Arabic, and Swahili. As part of her paraphernalia, Storm carries a set of lock-picks (with which she has an extraordinary ability at picking locks, including her teeth while her physical coordination was reduced to the level of an infant) and her ancestral ruby, which allows inter-dimensional transportation with the help of her lightning.

Physical abilities and traits
Storm's weather powers allow her body to compensate for climate extremes; on one occasion as she was trying to control an unnatural storm she becomes overwhelmed as her body temperature rises too high. In The Official Handbook of the Marvel Universe – X-Men (2004), it is stated that her powers enable her to breathe while moving at any speed and protect her from air friction, while granting her protection from temperature extremes of heat and cold; the All-New Official Handbook of the Marvel Universe Update #1 (2007) states that Storm's body changes temperature in opposition to her environment so that the colder the environment the warmer her body gets, and the warmer the environment the colder her body gets.

Her body compensates for rapid decreases or increases in atmospheric pressure. She can see in near-complete darkness and has superb dexterity. Storm has been described as having one of the strongest wills among the X-Men, making her highly resistant to psychic attacks especially in tandem with electrical fields she creates around herself.  Telepaths have found it difficult to track her down and probe her thoughts. Several of these traits are independent of her mutant status and are a result of her ancestry. Also, when using her powers, Storm's eyes turn solid white.

Storm has been stated to be an Omega-Level Mutant.

Her potential is as of yet unrealized, and on one occasion the Super Giant stated that Storm was an "Omega-Level Mutate", grouping and targeting her with Omega-Level mutants such as Iceman and Rachel Grey. Her Omega-Level status was eventually confirmed.

Storm's real name "Ororo" is translated in her language as "Beauty".

Cultural impact and legacy

Critical reception 
Andrew Wheeler of ComicsAlliance described Storm as "the first major black female superhero," stating, "Storm was designed to stand out from previous super-women, and not only by dint of her race. She also had long white hair and strange oval irises, and arguably the most formidable power set in the new team. From the start, her weather-control powers allowed her to summon raging winds and lightning strikes. She was a heavyweight who had been worshiped as a goddess, and there was never any question of her using her powers only to defend or evade. She wasn't introduced as a damsel, and she wasn't introduced as a love interest." Alex Abad-Santos of Vox called Storm "one of Marvel's most iconic characters," saying, "Marvel, for the past couple of years, has built up a notably diverse cast of heroes, and started to get serious about featuring its female leads. But arguably the most iconic non-white character the company has introduced to date is Storm, aka Ororo Munroe, who was first introduced in 1975. Clocking in at 5'11" with white hair, black skin, and the power to control the weather, Storm was startling, beautiful, and something readers had never seen before. She's a big reason writer Greg Pak picked up comic books." Ashanti El of Screen Rant referred to Storm as a "veteran X-Men hero and weather goddess," writing, "riginal X-Men and esteemed weather goddess, Storm, is the subject of brand new fan art that celebrates the mutant's legacy and importance in pop culture. Ororo Munroe, aka Storm, remains a popular figure in Marvel history. [...] Storm's fame in media stems from her unmatched representation as a black woman. In a time when the majority of superheroes were only white men in capes, Ororo broke the mold and proved that diversity in comics was possible and lucrative with the X-Men starring in several pop-culture landmarks, including the popular '90s animated series. A trailblazer among trailblazers, Storm's roles in comics helped to usher in a new wave of comic book heroes like Riri Williams, Lunella Lafayette, and Shuri. Cosplayers and fans also marvel at the mutant's stylish costumes including the iconic self-empowering '80s mohawk look." Danielle Broadway of The Mary Sue stated, "The Marvel character Storm is not only a staple of the X-Men franchise, but also a notorious fan favorite. From her epic weather control powers to her unique style, Storm has stolen the hearts of many. Created by writer Len Wein and artist Dave Cockrum, she’s one of the first and only Black woman superheroes in Marvel comics. [...] She illustrates what it means to be a Black woman as she fights to oppose stereotypes, violence, and commodification."

Karen Attiah of The Washington Post asserted, "African women are having a bit of a moment in American pop culture. From Nigerian author Chimamanda Adichie to Ghanaian-Nigerian author Taiye Selasie, to Kenyan star Lupita Nyong’o, African immigrant women are finding that their stories and performances resonate with American audiences. Now, a fictional woman is joining their ranks: Ororo Munroe, known as Storm, a member of Marvel’s X-Men team. [...] Even as a supporting character or member of an ensemble, Storm’s done it all. She’s been an African queen, a street thief, an X-Men team leader and the headmistress of the Jean Grey School of Higher Learning. In the world of comic book fantasy where black characters are scarce, the fact that Storm was one of the most powerful mutants in the X-Men universe was a point of pride growing up." Sara Century of Syfy said, "It’s no secret that Ororo Munroe is a FANGRRLS favorite. This is a woman that has been around the world and even a pretty fair amount of the galaxy yet she remains perhaps the most emotionally grounded X-Man. She’s an omega level mutant and finds herself regularly seated at tables of Marvel’s most powerful players. She has done everything from pickpocket to queen. She is kind of the best." David Harth of CBR.com wrote, "Storm has been on a long strange trip throughout her life in comics, one that's always seen her on an upward trajectory. From a thief on the streets of Cairo to a goddess on the African plains to a superhero and leader of the highest caliber, Ororo Munroe has proven nothing can hold her back. Storm remained one of the most beloved X-Men and an irreplaceable part of the team's mythos. Debuting on a stacked X-Men team, she was still able to stand out. Marvel and the creators who worked on Storm did their best to make her a better character, creating a superhero unlike any other." Chris Arrant of Newsarama wrote, "While her mutant ability to control the weather is a pivotal part of her, thanks to the writers and artists that have added layers to her character, it's Storm the woman and her often dueling qualities of tenacity, anger, forgiveness, and compassion that have forged her into a titan of modern fiction and cemented her into the bedrock foundation of Marvel Comics most important characters." IGN stated, "Storm's ability to manipulate and harness the weather makes her one of the most powerful mutants on Earth. But power like that comes at a great cost. Storm lives every day in a state of carefully maintained composure. Too much stress could be deadly for everyone around her. Fans have seen Storm as a thief, an X-Man, a fighter, and even a queen. Through it all, she remains one of the most relatable mutant heroes."

Accolades 

 In 2011, Wizard ranked Storm 89th in their "Wizard's top 200 comic book characters" list.
 In 2011, IGN ranked Storm 8th in their "The Top 25 X-Men" list and 42nd in their "Top 100 Comic Books Heroes" list.
 In 2011, Comics Buyer's Guide ranked Storm 30th in their "100 Sexiest Women in Comics" list.
 In 2012, IGN ranked Storm 37th in their "The Top 50 Avengers" list.
 In 2015, Entertainment Weekly ranked Storm 3rd in their "Let's rank every X-Man ever" list.
 In 2017, The Daily Dot ranked Storm 3rd in their "top 33 female superheroes of all time" list.
 In 2018, GameSpot ranked Storm 6th in their "50 Most Important Superheroes" list.
 In 2019, Comicbook.com ranked Storm 7th in their "50 Most Important Superheroes Ever" list.
 In 2019, Daily Mirror ranked Storm 4th in their "Best female superheroes of all time" list.
 In 2020, Scary Mommy ranked Storm 7th in their "Looking For A Role Model? These 195+ Marvel Female Characters Are Truly Heroic" list.
 In 2021, CBR.com ranked Storm 2nd in their "10 Bravest Mutants in Marvel Comics" list.
 In 2022, Looper include Storm in their "Most Powerful X-Men" list.
 In 2022, Screen Rant included Storm in their "10 Most Powerful X-Men" list.
 In 2022, Newsarama ranked Storm 2nd in their "Best X-Men members of all time" list.
 In 2022, The Mary Sue ranked Storm 7th in their "10 Most Powerful X-Men of All Time" list.
 In 2022, Newsarama ranked Storm 3rd in their "Best Marvel characters of all time" list.
 In 2022, CBR.com ranked Storm 2nd in their "X-Men's Greatest Leaders" list, 6th in their "10 Greatest X-Men, Ranked By Experience" list, 6th in their "10 Most Attractive Marvel Heroes" list, 7th in their "15 Strongest Omega-Level X-Men" list, and 10th in their "10 Most Charismatic Marvel Superheroes" list.
 In 2022, Screen Rant ranked Storm 8th in their "10 X-Men Characters, Ranked By Likability" list and included her in their "10 Most Powerful X-Men" list, in their "10 Best Black Panther Comics Characters Not In The MCU" list, and in their "10 Marvel Comics Gods Who Should Join The MCU Next" list.
 In 2023, CBR.com ranked Storm 2nd in their "10 Most Fashionable Marvel Heroes" list.

Literary reception

Volumes

X-Men: Curse of the Mutants - Storm & Gambit - 2010 
According to Diamond Comic Distributors, X-Men: Curse of the Mutants - Storm & Gambit #1 was the 55th best selling comic book in August 2010.

James Hunt of CBR.com called X-Men: Curse of the Mutants - Storm & Gambit #1 "remarkably good," asserting, "The issue sees Storm and Gambit -- characters with similar skill sets (if not powers) and a history of working together -- teaming up to steal Dracula's body from the heart of Vampire Island. It makes perfect sense to team this pair up, and strangely, this could have made for a reasonably satisfying issue of the main series, if only editorial were willing to break out of the fairly narrow idea of what an X-Men story has to be these days. [...] The big thing this book has going for it is that it is, far and away, the best thing to come out with the "Curse of the Mutants" name attached. In fact, it almost works well enough as a stand-alone piece to recommend buying even if you're not following the ongoing story. Give it a chance, and you might be surprised."

Storm - 2014 
According to Diamond Comic Distributors, Storm #1 was the 46th best selling comic book in July 2014.

At the 2007 Glyph Comics Awards, the Fan Award for Best Comic was won by Storm, by Eric Jerome Dickey, David Yardin & Lan Medina, and Jay Leisten & Sean Parsons.

Meagan Damore of CBR.com stated, "As powerful and profound as its protagonist, Greg Pak and Victor Ibanez's "Storm" #1 explores Ororo's ties around the world with befitting subtlety and grace. [...] For a single issue, "Storm" #1 has a lot going on under the surface. Pak, Ibanez, and Redmond have done Ororo great justice in creating such an inspiring, uplifting series for her with befitting subtlety and grace." Jeff Lake of IGN gave Storm #1 a grade of 8.3 out of 10, writing, "With Storm #1 Greg Pak and Victor Ibañez are off to a great start, injecting the character with a spark both familiar and refreshing. Though there's little to go on looking forward, the book's strong character work and emotive art are more than enough to merit a return read. All in all, Storm's first issue proves a welcome return to a fan favorite. Pak and Ibañez appear to have a great handle on the character, seemingly willing to show all of her different sides. Though the book thus far appears lacking in direction, The strong character work and excellent art make it a debut worth checking out."

Giant-Size X-Men: Storm - 2020 
According to Diamond Comic Distributors, Giant-Size X-Men: Storm #1 was the 22nd best selling comic book in September 2020.

Theo Dwyer of Bleeding Cool said, "That Johnathan Hickman can dip into that kind of existential exploration in a superhero comic like Giant-Size X-Men: Storm #1, which fully embraces its silliness and goes for the joke more often than for the heart in this issue, is impressive. That last bit is no points off, either. This Storm comic is funny as hell and has its own voice apart from the Fantomex story that it spins out of, and I've said it before, and I'll say it again: for an art form called "comics," there are few genuinely funny comics coming out. This is one of them." Nicole Drum of Comicbook.com gave Giant-Size X-Men: Storm #1 a grade of 5 out of 5, writing, "Giant-Size X-Men: Storm #1 is exquisite. The story itself is beautifully written. Hickman has captured perfectly the regalness and nuance of Storm while also managing to somehow get the other characters making up the issue right as well. Emma Frost is in the issue only briefly, but she's absolutely spot-on. And the art? The art is absolutely beyond gorgeous. Dauterman's art marries absolutely perfectly with Wilson's color. It's just so lush and graceful and, best of all, beautiful in a way that is realistic to the characters being drawn. From cover to cover, this is a truly glorious book and while there is a little bit of cliche in some of Storm's thoughts about life and its meaning, this book is so beautiful we'll just look past it. It's wonderful."

Other versions

In addition to her mainstream incarnation, the Marvel Comics character Storm has been depicted in other fictional universes. These alternative representations differ considerably from the details and events of the main "Storm" story, without affecting that story's narrative continuity.

Age of Apocalypse
In the hellish reality known as the Age of Apocalypse, Storm is a member of the X-Men, but more streetwise and tough, and her romantic interest is Quicksilver. Her appearance differs in that she has a black lightning tattoo over her left eye and a bob hair cut.

Years after the fall of Apocalypse, Weapon X, the AoA version of Wolverine whose mind was twisted into making him the heir of Apocalypse, captured and renamed her as Orordius after using the Celestial technology on her to enslave and transform her into a blind seer made of living stone.

Deadpool Corps
Professor X runs an orphanage for troubled kids where Storm is the headmistress. Kid versions of Cyclops and Deadpool are sent to her office for causing trouble.

Marvel Mangaverse
In Marvel Mangaverse, Storm is a witch who trained with Abigail Hefton. She is later seen as a mutant. It is implied she was killed by The Hand.

Marvel Zombies
The basic premise of the various Marvel Zombies stories is that almost all super-powered beings on Earth have become flesh-eating zombies after being infected by an alien virus. Alongside Thor, Dr. Strange, Colossus, and Nightcrawler, Storm is one of the last super-humans on her world to become a zombie.

Marriage to Forge
The 2004 series New X-Men posits an alternative future for Storm in which she, under her birth name Ororo, marries Forge and lives a happy married life in his building, Eagle's Plaza in Dallas, Texas.

NOW WHAT! (Marvel)
In this universe, Spider-Storm appears who is a amalgamation of Storm and Spider-Man. She is a member of the X-Vengers.

Amalgam Comics
Amalgam Comics was a brief publishing collaboration between Marvel and DC Comics, enabling characters owned by both companies to interact, and creating characters that were composites of Marvel and DC characters. Here, Ororo is a mutant with superpowers who nearly drowns as a child, but is rescued by Queen Hippolyta of the Amazons. Hippolyta raises young Ororo as an Amazon princess beside her own daughter Diana (see Wonder Woman) on the island of Themiscyra. She eventually leaves her island home to enter "Man's World" as Amazon, Amalgam's fusion of Storm and Wonder Woman. She joins the JLX — a cross between the Justice League of DC Comics and Marvel's X-Men, consisting of similarly merged characters — and becomes their leader.

Days of Future Past
In the dystopian Days of Future Past storyline of Chris Claremont (1981), Storm is one of the last fighters of the mutant resistance and is killed by a horde of robotic, mutant-hunting Sentinels.

Earth X
In a contemporary alternative universe, the Earth X series (started 1999 by Jim Krueger), Storm is known as "Queen Storm" and is married to Black Panther, something that happens in the mainstream universe seven years later.

Exiles
Two versions of Storm have appeared in Exiles:
 A version of Storm that was similar to her mainstream counterpart was killed by the Phoenix in a world where Jean Grey manifested the Phoenix force in a manner reminiscent of The Dark Phoenix Saga.
 One of the more prominent versions of Storm is a sixteen-year-old version of Ororo Munroe who is a member of the ruthless reality-hopping team Weapon X.

Mutant X (Marvel Comics)

Bloodstorm is a fictional mutant vampire from an alternative universe within the Marvel Comics multiverse. She is an alternative reality version of the X-Men's Storm. Though introduced as a supporting character in Mutant X, she quickly became the breakout character of the series. Editors reported that the majority of fan mail to Mutant X was focused on her.

Bloodstorm's history branches from her mainstream counterpart during the events of The Uncanny X-Men #159, in that she was not saved from the bite of Dracula and was transformed into a vampire. As she still retains her oath not to kill (in mainstream continuity she did not break that oath until The Uncanny X-Men #170, after her encounter with Dracula), Bloodstorm employs Forge and Kitty Pryde as food sources, draining from them enough to sustain herself but not to kill them. She leaves the X-Men and joins the team The Six.

Limbo Storm
In The Uncanny X-Men #160 and in the Magik (Illyana and Storm) limited series, an alternative Storm is introduced, who lives the remaining years of her life in the demonic realm of Limbo.

Old Man Logan
In the "Old Man Logan" storyline, Storm is among the X-Men who perish at the hands of Wolverine when he is tricked by Mysterio into believing his friends are super-villains attacking the mansion.

Ultimate Marvel
In the Ultimate Marvel continuity, Storm is a founding member of the "Ultimate X-Men", created by Mark Millar and Joe Quesada in February 2001. Millar, who wrote for the series until July 2003, established Storm as an illegal immigrant from Morocco who lived in Athens, Texas as a car thief prior joining the X-Men. In contrast to her mainstream counterpart, Ultimate Storm initially has trouble controlling her powers. For example, she once passes out after reluctantly summoning an electrical storm in order to destroy a fleet of Sentinels; her reluctance stemming from a past incident where she nearly electrocuted a playground full of children.

When later writer Brian Michael Bendis seemingly killed Beast off in April 2004, a grief-stricken Storm drastically alters her appearance. This change parallels the transformation her mainstream counterpart goes through under Claremont and Smith.

Subsequent writer Brian K. Vaughan wrote Storm to act as the team's conscience and started a relationship between her and Wolverine. In the "Ultimate X-Men: Shock and Awe" arc (2005), Vaughan inserted new elements into her back story by establishing Yuriko "Yuri" Oyama as Storm's archenemy.

X-Men: Forever
In this alternative reality (with a history identical to 616), Storm kills Wolverine for unknown reasons as an agent of the Consortium (as yet unrevealed) and betrays the X-Men. As the X-Men search for her in New York City, an adolescent Storm with short hair appears to Gambit, just as young as she had appeared to him before. When Beast checks bloodwork, both Storms are identical.  At the series conclusion, with the adult Storm-clone, now calling herself 'Perfect Storm', having become Wakanda's Queen after killing the Black Panther, the other two Storms merge into another adult Storm, keeping Perfect Storm prisoner while taking her place as Wakanda's Queen to undo the harm she had caused.

What If...?
Marvel's What If comic book series, which imagines alternative realities for Marvel characters, has featured Storm several times.  The depicted relationship between Wolverine and Storm was also shown in the X-Men animated series episode "X-Men: The Animated Series: 'One Man's Worth'" (1995).

In other media

Storm has made numerous appearances in other media, including the X-Men animated television series, X-Men: Evolution and Wolverine and the X-Men. She has appeared in six 20th Century Fox live-action X-Men films; she is portrayed by actress Halle Berry in four of the films and her younger self is portrayed by Alexandra Shipp in X-Men: Apocalypse and X-Men: Dark Phoenix. She has also been in a large number of video games: a guest appearance in Spider-Man: Web of Shadows and a playable character in every game in the X-Men Legends/Marvel: Ultimate Alliance/Marvel: Ultimate Alliance 2 series.

Collected editions

References

External links
 Storm at Marvel.com

African-American superheroes
Avengers (comics) characters
Black characters in films
Black characters in video games
Black people in comics
Characters created by Dave Cockrum
Characters created by Len Wein
Comics characters introduced in 1975
Female characters in animation
Female characters in film
Female characters in television
Fictional characters from New York City
Fictional characters with air or wind abilities
Fictional characters with electric or magnetic abilities
Fictional characters with weather abilities
Fictional Kenyan people
Fictional professional thieves
Fictional queens
Fictional tribal chiefs
Marvel Comics characters who have mental powers
Marvel Comics female superheroes
Marvel Comics film characters
Marvel Comics mutants
Marvel Comics orphans
Superheroes who are adopted
X-Men members